Geodromus becvari is a species of ground beetle in the subfamily Harpalinae and genus Geodromus.

References

Harpalinae
Beetles described in 2006